Mohammed Amin  is a British businessman who has been Chairman of the Conservative Muslim Forum, an affiliated group within the British Conservative Party, since mid-2014.  The Conservative Muslim chief is reported in June 2019 as having been expelled from the Tory Muslim group  following his strong public criticism of the 'moral integrity' of Boris Johnson. He resigned from the Conservative Party on 23 July 2019 when Johnson was announced as the new leader.  He writes regularly about political and community cohesion issues on the ConservativeHome website.

Amin has lived in the UK since 1952. He graduated in mathematics from Clare College, Cambridge, then obtained a Post Graduate Certificate in Education from the University of Leeds. He is a chartered accountant and a fellow of the Chartered Institute of Taxation. He served on the Council for 12 years, standing down in 2015. In 2005 he became a Fellow of the Royal Society of Arts.

Amin was the first Muslim partner of Price Waterhouse UK, now PricewaterhouseCoopers.  He was elected to PwC's Supervisory Board from 2003  to 2009. Before his retirement at the end of 2009, Amin was PwC's head of Islamic finance in the UK.

Amin is Co-Chair of the Muslim Jewish Forum of Greater Manchester, Chairman of the Council of the Islam & Liberty Network, and Chair of Donors of the Curriculum for Cohesion. He speaks and writes regularly on Islamic finance and on issues connected with politics and social cohesion. Clare College, Cambridge chose him as its Alumnus of the Year for 2014. He was awarded an MBE in the Queen's Birthday Honours List June 2016 "For services to Community Cohesion and Inter-faith Relations in Greater Manchester."

See also
 List of British Pakistanis
 Islamophobia in the UK Conservative Party#Calls for an independent inquiry

References

Year of birth missing (living people)
Living people
Alumni of Clare College, Cambridge
Members of the Order of the British Empire
British Muslims
British politicians of Pakistani descent